Walking (also known as ambulation) is one of the main gaits of terrestrial locomotion among legged animals. Walking is typically slower than running and other gaits. Walking is defined by an 'inverted pendulum' gait in which the body vaults over the stiff limb or limbs with each step. This applies regardless of the usable number of limbs—even arthropods, with six, eight, or more limbs, walk.

Difference from running

The word walk is descended from the Old English wealcan "to roll". In humans and other bipeds, walking is generally distinguished from running in that only one foot at a time leaves contact with the ground and there is a period of double-support. In contrast, running begins when both feet are off the ground with each step. This distinction has the status of a formal requirement in competitive walking events. For quadrupedal species, there are numerous gaits which may be termed walking or running, and distinctions based upon the presence or absence of a suspended phase or the number of feet in contact any time do not yield mechanically correct classification. The most effective method to distinguish walking from running is to measure the height of a person's centre of mass using motion capture or a force plate at midstance. During walking, the centre of mass reaches a maximum height at midstance, while running, it is then at a minimum. This distinction, however, only holds true for locomotion over level or approximately level ground. For walking up grades above 10%, this distinction no longer holds for some individuals. Definitions based on the percentage of the stride during which a foot is in contact with the ground (averaged across all feet) of greater than 50% contact corresponds well with identification of 'inverted pendulum' mechanics and are indicative of walking for animals with any number of limbs, although this definition is incomplete. Running humans and animals may have contact periods greater than 50% of a gait cycle when rounding corners, running uphill or carrying loads.

Speed is another factor that distinguishes walking from running. Although walking speeds can vary greatly depending on many factors such as height, weight, age, terrain, surface, load, culture, effort, and fitness, the average human walking speed at crosswalks is about 5.0 kilometres per hour (km/h), or about 1.4 meters per second (m/s), or about 3.1 miles per hour (mph).
In Japan, the standard measure for walking speed is 80 m/min (4.8 km/h).

An average human child achieves independent walking ability at around 11 months old.

Health benefits

Regular, brisk exercise of any kind can improve confidence, stamina, energy, weight control and life expectancy and reduces stress. It can also decrease the risk of coronary heart disease, strokes, diabetes, high blood pressure, bowel cancer and osteoporosis. Scientific studies have also shown that walking, besides its physical benefits, is also beneficial for the mind, improving memory skills, learning ability, concentration, mood, creativity, and abstract reasoning. Sustained walking sessions for a minimum period of thirty to sixty minutes a day, five days a week, with the correct walking posture, reduce health risks and have various overall health benefits, such as reducing the chances of cancer, type 2 diabetes, heart disease, anxiety disorder and depression. Life expectancy is also increased even for individuals suffering from obesity or high blood pressure. Walking also improves bone health, especially strengthening the hip bone, and lowering the harmful low-density lipoprotein (LDL) cholesterol, and raising the useful high-density lipoprotein (HDL) cholesterol. Studies have found that walking may also help prevent dementia and Alzheimer's. Walking at a pace that increases ones heart rate to 70% of their maximum heart rate, also known as the "fat-burning heart rate" can cause the body to utilize its fat reserves for energy leading to fat loss. An individual's maximum heart rate can be calculated by subtracting their age from 220.

The Centers for Disease Control and Prevention's fact sheet on the "Relationship of Walking to Mortality Among U.S. Adults with Diabetes" states that those with diabetes who walked for 2 or more hours a week lowered their mortality rate from all causes by 39 percent. Women who took 4,500 steps to 7,500 steps a day seemed to have fewer premature deaths compared to those who only took 2,700 steps a day. "Walking lengthened the life of people with diabetes regardless of age, sex, race, body mass index, length of time since diagnosis and presence of complications or functional limitations."

New research in 2022 led to the recommendation that a commuter should walk at least 6000 steps, each weekday throughout a year, to reach optimal health effects.  

Governments now recognize the benefits of walking for mental and physical health and are actively encouraging it. This growing emphasis on walking has arisen because people walk less nowadays than previously. In the UK, a Department of Transport report found that between 1995/97 and 2005 the average number of walk trips per person fell by 16%, from 292 to 245 per year. Many professionals in local authorities and the National Health Service are employed to halt this decline by ensuring that the built environment allows people to walk and that there are walking opportunities available to them. Professionals working to encourage walking come mainly from six sectors: health, transport, environment, schools, sport and recreation, and urban design.

One program to encourage walking is "The Walking the Way to Health Initiative", organized by the British walkers association The Ramblers, which is the largest volunteer led walking scheme in the United Kingdom. Volunteers are trained to lead free Health Walks from community venues such as libraries and doctors' surgeries. The scheme has trained over 35,000 volunteers and has over 500 schemes operating across the UK, with thousands of people walking every week. A new organization called "Walk England" launched a web site in June 2008 to provide these professionals with evidence, advice, and examples of success stories of how to encourage communities to walk more. The site has a social networking aspect to allow professionals and the public to ask questions, post news and events, and communicate with others in their area about walking, as well as a "walk now" option to find out what walks are available in each region. Similar organizations exist in other countries and recently a "Walking Summit" was held in the United States. This "assembled thought-leaders and influencers from business, urban planning and real estate, [along with] physicians and public health officials", and others, to discuss how to make American cities and communities places where "people can and want to walk".
Walking is more prevalent in European cities that have dense residential areas mixed with commercial areas and good public transportation.

Origins

It is theorized that "walking" among tetrapods originated underwater with air-breathing fish that could "walk" underwater, giving rise (potentially with vertebrates like Tiktaalik) to the plethora of land-dwelling life that walk on four or two limbs. While terrestrial tetrapods are theorised to have a single origin, arthropods and their relatives are thought to have independently evolved walking several times, specifically in insects, myriapods, chelicerates, tardigrades, onychophorans, and crustaceans. Little skates, members of the demersal fish community, can propel themselves by pushing off the ocean floor with their pelvic fins, using neural mechanisms which evolved as early as 420 million years ago, before vertebrates set foot on land.

Hominin 
Data in the fossil record indicate that among hominin ancestors, bipedal walking was one of the first defining characteristics to emerge, predating other defining characteristics of Hominidae. Judging from footprints discovered on a former shore in Kenya, it is thought possible that ancestors of modern humans were walking in ways very similar to the present activity as long as 3 million years ago.

Today, the walking gait of humans is unique and differs significantly from bipedal or quadrupedal walking gaits of other primates, like chimpanzees. It is believed to have been selectively advantageous in hominin ancestors in the Miocene due to metabolic energy efficiency. Human walking has been found to be slightly more energy efficient than travel for a quadrupedal mammal of a similar size, like chimpanzees. The energy efficiency of human locomotion can be accounted for by the reduced use of muscle in walking, due to an upright posture which places ground reaction forces at the hip and knee. When walking bipedally, chimpanzees take a crouched stance with bent knees and hips, forcing the quadriceps muscles to perform extra work and consequently costs more energy. Comparing chimpanzee quadrupedal travel to that of true quadrupedal animals has indicated that chimpanzees expend one-hundred and fifty percent of the energy required for travel compared to true quadrupeds.

In 2007, a study further explored the origin of human bipedalism, using chimpanzee and human energetic costs of locomotion. They found that the energy spent in moving the human body is less than what would be expected for an animal of similar size and approximately seventy-five percent less costly than that of chimpanzees. Chimpanzee quadrupedal and bipedal energy costs are found to be relatively equal, with chimpanzee bipedalism costing roughly ten percent more than quadrupedal. The same 2007 study found that among chimpanzee individuals, the energy costs for bipedal and quadrupedal walking varied significantly, and those that flexed their knees and hips to a greater degree and took a more upright posture, closer to that of humans, were able to save more energy than chimpanzees that did not take this stance. Further, compared to other apes, humans have longer legs and short dorsally oriented ischia (hipbone), which result in longer hamstring extensor moments, improving walking energy economy. It was thought that hominins like Ardipithecus ramidus, which had a variety of both terrestrial and arboreal adaptions would not be as efficient walkers, however, with a small body mass A. ramidus had developed an energy efficient means of bipedal walking while still maintaining arboreal adaptations. Humans have long femoral necks, meaning that while walking, hip muscles do not require as much energy to flex while moving. These slight kinematic and anatomic differences demonstrate how bipedal walking may have developed as the dominant means of locomotion among early hominins because of the energy saved.

Variants

 Scrambling is a method of ascending a hill or mountain that involves using both hands, because of the steepness of the terrain. Of necessity, it will be a slow and careful form of walking and with possibly of occasional brief, easy rock climbing. Some scrambling takes place on narrow exposed ridges where more attention to balance will be required than in normal walking.
 Snow shoeing – Snowshoes are footwear for walking over the snow. Snowshoes work by distributing the weight of the person over a larger area so that the person's foot does not sink completely into the snow, a quality called "flotation". It is often said by snowshoers that if you can walk, you can snowshoe. This is true in optimal conditions, but snowshoeing properly requires some slight adjustments to walking. The method of walking is to lift the shoes slightly and slide the inner edges over each other, thus avoiding the unnatural and fatiguing "straddle-gait" that would otherwise be necessary. A snowshoer must be willing to roll his or her feet slightly as well. An exaggerated stride works best when starting out, particularly with larger or traditional shoes.
Cross-country skiing – originally conceived like snow shoes as a means of travel in deep snow. Trails hiked in the summer are often skied in the winter and the Norwegian Trekking Association maintains over 400 huts stretching across thousands of kilometres of trails which hikers can use in the summer and skiers in the winter.
 Beach walking is a sport that is based on a walk on the sand of the beach. Beach walking can be developed on compact sand or non-compact sand. There are beach walking competitions on non-compact sand, and there are world records of beach walking on non-compact sand in Multiday distances. Beach walking has a specific technique of walk.

 Nordic walking is a physical activity and a sport, which is performed with specially designed walking poles similar to ski poles. Compared to regular walking, Nordic walking (also called pole walking) involves applying force to the poles with each stride. Nordic walkers use more of their entire body (with greater intensity) and receive fitness building stimulation not present in normal walking for the chest, lats, triceps, biceps, shoulder, abdominals, spinal and other core muscles that may result in significant increases in heart rate at a given pace. Nordic walking has been estimated as producing up to a 46% increase in energy consumption, compared to walking without poles.
 Pedestrianism is a sport that developed during the late eighteenth and nineteenth centuries, and was a popular spectator sport in the British Isles. By the end of the 18th century, and especially with the growth of the popular press, feats of foot travel over great distances (similar to a modern ultramarathon) gained attention, and were labeled "pedestrianism". Interest in the sport, and the wagering which accompanied it, spread to the United States, Canada, and Australia in the 19th century. By the end of the 19th century, Pedestrianism was largely displaced by the rise in modern spectator sports and by controversy involving rules, which limited its appeal as a source of wagering and led to its inclusion in the amateur athletics movement. Pedestrianism was first codified in the last half of the 19th century, evolving into what would become racewalking, By the mid 19th century, competitors were often expected to extend their legs straight at least once in their stride, and obey what was called the "fair heel and toe" rule. This rule, the source of modern racewalking, was a vague commandment that the toe of one foot could not leave the ground before the heel of the next foot touched down. This said, rules were customary and changed with the competition. Racers were usually allowed to jog in order to fend off cramps, and it was distance, not code, which determined gait for longer races. Newspaper reports suggest that "trotting" was common in events.
 Speed walking is the general term for fast walking. Within the Speed Walking category are a variety of fast walking techniques: Power Walking, Fit Walking, etc.
 Power walking is the act of walking with a speed at the upper end of the natural range for walking gait, typically . To qualify as power walking as opposed to jogging or running, at least one foot must be in contact with the ground at all times.
 Racewalking is a long-distance athletic event. Although it is a foot race, it is different from running in that one foot must appear to be in contact with the ground at all times. Stride length is reduced, so to achieve competitive speeds, racewalkers must attain cadence rates comparable to those achieved by Olympic 800-meter runners, and they must do so for hours at a time since the Olympic events are the  race walk (men and women) and  race walk (men only), and  events are also held. See also pedestrianism above.
 Afghan walking: The Afghan Walk is a rhythmic breathing technique synchronized with walking. It was born in the 1980s on the basis of the observations made by the Frenchman Édouard G. Stiegler, during his contacts with Afghan caravaners, capable of making walks of more than 60 km per day for dozens of days.

Biomechanics

Human walking is accomplished with a strategy called the double pendulum. During forward motion, the leg that leaves the ground swings forward from the hip. This sweep is the first pendulum. Then the leg strikes the ground with the heel and rolls through to the toe in a motion described as an inverted pendulum. The motion of the two legs is coordinated so that one foot or the other is always in contact with the ground. While walking, the muscles of the calf contract, raising the body's center of mass, while this muscle is contracted potential energy is stored. Then gravity pulls the body forward and down onto the other leg and the potential energy is then transformed into kinetic energy. The process of human walking is able to save approximately sixty-five percent of the energy used by utilizing gravity in forward motion.

Walking differs from a running gait in a number of ways. The most obvious is that during walking one leg always stays on the ground while the other is swinging. In running there is typically a ballistic phase where the runner is airborne with both feet in the air (for bipedals).

Another difference concerns the movement of the centre of mass of the body. In walking the body "vaults" over the leg on the ground, raising the centre of mass to its highest point as the leg passes the vertical, and dropping it to the lowest as the legs are spread apart. Essentially kinetic energy of forward motion is constantly being traded for a rise in potential energy. This is reversed in running where the centre of mass is at its lowest as the leg is vertical. This is because the impact of landing from the ballistic phase is absorbed by bending the leg and consequently storing energy in muscles and tendons. In running there is a conversion between kinetic, potential, and elastic energy.

There is an absolute limit on an individual's speed of walking (without special techniques such as those employed in speed walking) due to the upwards acceleration of the centre of mass during a stride – if it is greater than the acceleration due to gravity the person will become airborne as they vault over the leg on the ground. Typically, however, animals switch to a run at a lower speed than this due to energy efficiencies.

Based on the 2D inverted pendulum model of walking, there are at least five physical constraints that place fundamental limits on walking like an inverted pendulum. These constraints are: take-off constraint, sliding constraint, fall-back constraint, steady-state constraint, high step-frequency constraint.

Leisure activity

Many people enjoy walking as a recreation in the mainly urban modern world, and it is one of the best forms of exercise. For some, walking is a way to enjoy nature and the outdoors; and for others the physical, sporting and endurance aspect is more important.

There are a variety of different kinds of walking, including bushwalking, racewalking, beach walking, hillwalking, volksmarching, Nordic walking, trekking, dog walking and hiking. Some people prefer to walk indoors on a treadmill, or in a gym, and fitness walkers and others may use a pedometer to count their steps. Hiking is the usual word used in Canada, the United States and South Africa for long vigorous walks; similar walks are called tramps in New Zealand, or hill walking or just walking in Australia, the UK and the Irish Republic. In the UK, rambling is also used. Australians also bushwalk. In English-speaking parts of North America, the term walking is used for short walks, especially in towns and cities. Snow shoeing is walking in snow; a slightly different gait is required compared with regular walking.

Tourism
In terms of tourism, the possibilities range from guided walking tours in cities, to organized trekking holidays in the Himalayas. In the UK the term walking tour also refers to a multi-day walk or hike undertaken by a group or individual. Well-organized systems of trails exist in many other European counties, as well as Canada, United States, New Zealand, and Nepal. Systems of lengthy waymarked walking trails now stretch across Europe from Norway to Turkey, Portugal to Cyprus. Many also walk the traditional pilgrim routes, of which the most famous is El Camino de Santiago, The Way of St. James.

Numerous walking festivals and other walking events take place each year in many countries. The world's largest multi-day walking event is the International Four Days Marches Nijmegen in the Netherlands. The "Vierdaagse" (Dutch for "Four day Event") is an annual walk that has taken place since 1909; it has been based at Nijmegen since 1916. Depending on age group and category, walkers have to walk 30, 40 or 50 kilometers each day for four days. Originally a military event with a few civilians, it now is a mainly civilian event. Numbers have risen in recent years, with over 40,000 now taking part, including about 5,000 military personnel. Due to crowds on the route, since 2004 the organizers have limited the number of participants. In the U.S., there is the annual Labor Day walk on Mackinac Bridge, Michigan, which draws over 60,000 participants; it is the largest single-day walking event; while the Chesapeake Bay Bridge Walk in Maryland draws over 50,000 participants each year. There are also various walks organised as charity events, with walkers sponsored for a specific cause. These walks range in length from two miles (3 km) or five km to 50 miles (80 km). The MS Challenge Walk is an 80 km or 50-mile walk which raises money to fight multiple sclerosis, while walkers in the Oxfam Trailwalker cover 100 km or 60 miles.

Rambling
In Britain, The Ramblers, a registered charity, is the largest organisation that looks after the interests of walkers, with some 100,000 members. Its "Get Walking Keep Walking" project provides free route guides, led walks, as well as information for people new to walking. The Long Distance Walkers Association in the UK is for the more energetic walker, and organizes lengthy challenge hikes of 20 or even 50 miles (30 to 80 km) or more in a day. The LDWA's annual "Hundred" event, entailing walking 100 miles or 160 km in 48 hours, takes place each British Spring Bank Holiday weekend.

Walkability

There has been a recent focus among urban planners in some communities to create pedestrian-friendly areas and roads, allowing commuting, shopping and recreation to be done on foot. The concept of walkability has arisen as a measure of the degree to which an area is friendly to walking. Some communities are at least partially car-free, making them particularly supportive of walking and other modes of transportation. In the United States, the active living network is an example of a concerted effort to develop communities more friendly to walking and other physical activities.

An example of such efforts to make urban development more pedestrian friendly is the pedestrian village. This is a compact, pedestrian-oriented neighborhood or town, with a mixed-use village center, that follows the tenets of New Pedestrianism. Shared-use lanes for pedestrians and those using bicycles, Segways, wheelchairs, and other small rolling conveyances that do not use internal combustion engines. Generally, these lanes are in front of the houses and businesses, and streets for motor vehicles are always at the rear. Some pedestrian villages might be nearly car-free with cars either hidden below the buildings or on the periphery of the village. Venice, Italy is essentially a pedestrian village with canals. The canal district in Venice, California, on the other hand, combines the front lane/rear street approach with canals and walkways, or just walkways.

Walking is also considered to be a clear example of a sustainable mode of transport, especially suited for urban use and/or relatively shorter distances. Non-motorized transport modes such as walking, but also cycling, small-wheeled transport (skates, skateboards, push scooters and hand carts) or wheelchair travel are often key elements of successfully encouraging clean urban transport. A large variety of case studies and good practices (from European cities and some worldwide examples) that promote and stimulate walking as a means of transportation in cities can be found at Eltis, Europe's portal for local transport.

The development of specific rights of way with appropriate infrastructure can promote increased participation and enjoyment of walking. Examples of types of investment include pedestrian malls, and foreshoreways such as oceanways and also river walks.

The first purpose-built pedestrian street in Europe is the Lijnbaan in Rotterdam, opened in 1953. The first pedestrianised shopping centre in the United Kingdom was in Stevenage in 1959. A large number of European towns and cities have made part of their centres car-free since the early 1960s. These are often accompanied by car parks on the edge of the pedestrianised zone, and, in the larger cases, park and ride schemes. Central Copenhagen is one of the largest and oldest: It was converted from car traffic into pedestrian zone in 1962.

In robotics

Generally, the first successful walking robots had six legs. As microprocessor technology advanced, the number of legs could be reduced and there are now robots that can walk on two legs. One, for example, is ASIMO. Although there has been significant advances, robots still do not walk nearly as well as human beings as they often need to keep their knees bent permanently in order to improve stability.

In 2009, Japanese roboticist Tomotaka Takahashi developed a robot that can jump three inches off the ground. The robot, named Ropid, is capable of getting up, walking, running, and jumping.

Many other robots have also been able to walk over the years like a bipedal walking robot.

Mathematical models 
Multiple mathematical models have been proposed to reproduce the kinematics observed in walking. These may be broadly broken down into four categories: rule-based models based on mechanical considerations and past literature, weakly coupled phase oscillators models, control-based models which guide simulations to maximize some property of locomotion, and phenomenological models which fit equations directly to the kinematics.

Rule-based models 
The rule-based models integrate the past literature on motor control to generate a few simple rules which are presumed to be responsible for walking (e.g. “loading of the left leg triggers unloading of right leg”). Such models are generally most strictly based on the past literature and when they are based on a few rules can be easy to interpret. However, the influence of each rule can be hard to interpret when these models become more complex. Furthermore, the tuning of parameters is often done in an ad hoc way, revealing little intuition about why the system may be organized in this way. Finally, such models are typically based fully on sensory feedback, ignoring the effect of descending and rhythm generating neurons, which have been shown to be crucial in coordinating proper walking.

Coupled oscillator models 
Dynamical system theory shows that any network with cyclical dynamics may be modeled as a set of weakly coupled phase oscillators, so another line of research has been exploring this view of walking. Each oscillator may model a muscle, joint angle, or even a whole leg, and is coupled to some set of other oscillators. Often, these oscillators are thought to represent the central pattern generators underlying walking. These models have rich theory behind them, allow for some extensions based on sensory feedback, and can be fit to kinematics. However, they need to be heavily constrained to fit to data and by themselves make no claims on which gaits allow the animal to move faster, more robustly, or more efficiently.

Control based models 
Control-based models start with a simulation based some description of the animal's anatomy and optimize control parameters to generate some behavior. These may be based on a musculoskeletal model, skeletal model, or even simply a ball and stick model. As these models generate locomotion by optimizing some metric, they can be used to explore the space of optimal locomotion behaviors under some assumptions. However, they typically do not generate plausible hypotheses on the neural coding underlying the behaviors and are typically sensitive to modeling assumptions.

Statistical models 
Phenomenological models model the kinematics of walking directly by fitting a dynamical system, without postulating an underlying mechanism for how the kinematics are generated neurally. Such models can produce the most realistic kinematic trajectories and thus have been explored for simulating walking for computer-based animation. However, the lack of underlying mechanism makes it hard to apply these models to study the biomechanical or neural properties of walking.

Animals

Horses

When walking, a horse's legs follow this sequence: left hind leg, left front leg, right hind leg, right front leg, in a regular 1-2-3-4 beat. At the walk, the horse will always have one foot raised and the other three feet on the ground, save for a brief moment when weight is being transferred from one foot to another. A horse moves its head and neck in a slight up and down motion that helps maintain balance.

Ideally, the advancing rear hoof oversteps the spot where the previously advancing front hoof touched the ground. The more the rear hoof oversteps, the smoother and more comfortable the walk becomes. Individual horses and different breeds vary in the smoothness of their walk. However, a rider will almost always feel some degree of gentle side-to-side motion in the horse's hips as each hind leg reaches forward.

The fastest "walks" with a four-beat footfall pattern are actually the lateral forms of ambling gaits such as the running walk, singlefoot, and similar rapid but smooth intermediate speed gaits. If a horse begins to speed up and lose a regular four-beat cadence to its gait, the horse is no longer walking but is beginning to either trot or pace.

Elephants

Elephants can move both forwards and backwards, but cannot trot, jump, or gallop. They use only two gaits when moving on land, the walk and a faster gait similar to running. In walking, the legs act as pendulums, with the hips and shoulders rising and falling while the foot is planted on the ground. With no "aerial phase", the fast gait does not meet all the criteria of running, although the elephant uses its legs much like other running animals, with the hips and shoulders falling and then rising while the feet are on the ground. At this speed, most other quadrupeds are well into a gallop, even accounting for leg length.

Walking fish

Walking fish (or ambulatory fish) are fish that are able to travel over land for extended periods of time. The term may also be used for some other cases of nonstandard fish locomotion, e.g., when describing fish "walking" along the sea floor, as the handfish or frogfish.

Insects 
Insects must carefully coordinate their six legs during walking to produce gaits that allow for efficient navigation of their environment. Interleg coordination patterns have been studied in a variety of insects, including locusts (Schistocerca gregaria), cockroaches (Periplaneta americana), stick insects (Carausius morosus), and fruit flies (Drosophila melanogaster). Different walking gaits have been observed to exist on a speed dependent continuum of phase relationships. Even though their walking gaits are not discrete, they can often be broadly categorized as either a metachronal wave gait, tetrapod gait, or tripod gait.

In a metachronal wave gait, only one leg leaves contact with the ground at a time. This gait starts at one of the hind legs, then propagates forward to the mid and front legs on the same side before starting at the hind leg of the contralateral side. The wave gait is often used at slow walking speeds and is the most stable, since five legs are always in contact with the ground at a time.

In a tetrapod gait, two legs swing at a time while the other four legs remain in contact with the ground. There are multiple configurations for tetrapod gaits, but the legs that swing together must be on contralateral sides of the body. Tetrapod gaits are typically used at medium speeds and are also very stable.

A walking gait is considered tripod if three of the legs enter the swing phase simultaneously, while the other three legs make contact with the ground. The middle leg of one side swings with the hind and front legs on the contralateral side. Tripod gaits are most commonly used at high speeds, though it can be used at lower speeds. The tripod gait is less stable than wave-like and tetrapod gaits, but it is theorized to be the most robust. This means that it is easier for an insect to recover from an offset in step timing when walking in a tripod gait. The ability to respond robustly is important for insects when traversing uneven terrain.

See also

 Arm swing in human locomotion
 Duckwalk
 Footpath
 Gait training
 Hand walking
 International charter for walking
 Kinhin
Obesity and walking
 Preferred walking speed
 Student transport
 Tobler's hiking function
 Walkathon
 Walking audit
 Walking bus
 Walking tour

References

External links

 European Local Transport Information Service (Eltis) provides case studies concerning walking as a local transport concept.
 

 
Hiking
Private transport
Articles containing video clips